Events in the year 1973 in Bulgaria.

Incumbents 

 General Secretaries of the Bulgarian Communist Party: Todor Zhivkov
 Chairmen of the Council of Ministers: Stanko Todorov

Events 

 3 March – Balkan Bulgarian Airlines Flight 307, a scheduled international passenger flight from Sofia to Moscow, crashed on its final approach to Moscow's Sheremetyevo Airport killing all 25 passengers and crew on board.

Sports

References 

 
1970s in Bulgaria
Years of the 20th century in Bulgaria
Bulgaria